UNIGIS is a worldwide network of universities cooperating since 1992 in the design, development and delivery of distance learning in Geographical Information Science and Systems (GIS). Members of the UNIGIS network offer Postgraduate Certificate, Diploma and Masters courses in GIS by open and distance learning, following the mission of Educating GIS Professionals Worldwide.

Members of the UNIGIS network also work together in research and curriculum development activities related to GIS education. Programmes and courses are under continuous development and are currently being offered in English, German, Hungarian, Portuguese, Spanish and Polish languages. UNIGIS each year enrolls more than 600 new students worldwide.

UNIGIS courses
UNIGIS courses are modular and flexible study programmes. The content varies to meet local student needs. Optional courses give the opportunity to tailor the programme to meet individual student needs, and residential workshops are offered to support areas of the courses. Topics covered in the UNIGIS courses include:
Spatial Data
Database Theory
Geodata Sources
GIS and Organisations
Spatial Thinking
Visualisation of Spatial Data
Project Management
Applications Development
Remote Sensing
GIS and Modelling
Environmental Impact Analysis

Students use digital and printed study materials including specially developed study notes, guided readings, and practical exercises. Professional GIS software to support practical work is provided at no cost to students. Students are encouraged to use their work experience in the course, and to apply their new knowledge from their study to their work situations.

Partner institutions
UNIGIS International Association
UNIGIS Amsterdam at the Vrije Universiteit Amsterdam
UNIGIS Central Asia at  ACA*GIScience
UNIGIS Girona at the University of Girona
UNIGIS Hungary at the Óbuda University (Alba Regia Technical Faculty, Institute of Geoinformatics)
UNIGIS India
UNIGIS Kathmandu, jointly provided by the University of Salzburg and Kathmandu Forestry College
UNIGIS Latin America at Universidad San Francisco de Quito and the University of Belgrano
UNIGIS Lisbon at Universidade Nova de Lisboa
UNIGIS Poland at the Jagiellonian University in Kraków
UNIGIS Salzburg (German and English language) at the University of Salzburg
UNIGIS Zagreb at the University of Salzburg, delivered through Oikon

See also
Geographic Information System
Geographic Information Science
Geoinformatics

Social media
LinkedIn UNIGIS Alumni Worldwide
Blog UNIGIS News

References

International college and university associations and consortia
Information technology education
Information technology organizations
Geographic information systems organizations